The Angolan hairy bat (Cistugo seabrae) also known as Angolan wing-gland bat is a species of bat in the Cistugidae family.
It can be found in hot deserts in Angola, Namibia, and South Africa.

Taxonomy and etymology
It was described as a new species in 1912 by British zoologist Oldfield Thomas. Thomas decided that the taxa was so distinct, it warranted the description of a new genus, Cistugo. The Angolan hairy bat is the type species for Cistugo. The holotype of the species was captured in Mossamedes, Angola. The eponym for the species name "seabrae" is Antero Frederico de Seabra.

Description
It has "peculiar thickened glands" on its wings with three on each wing.

Range and status
It is found in several countries in Southern Africa including Angola, Namibia, and South Africa. As of 2017, it is evaluated as a least-concern species by the IUCN.

References

Mammals described in 1912
Cistugo
Taxonomy articles created by Polbot
Bats of Africa
Taxa named by Oldfield Thomas